The Marston Science Library, often called Marston, is the science and engineering library of the University of Florida located in Gainesville, Florida, and is administered by the university's George A. Smathers Libraries system.  The Marston Science Library hosts the university's extensive collections in agriculture, biological sciences, chemical and physical sciences, engineering, mathematics and statistics as well as librarians trained to help students and faculty working in these fields. It's located in the center of the university's campus adjacent to campus landmarks such as Turlington Hall, the University Auditorium and Century Tower.  In 2008, Marston began hosting an annual competition, the Elegance of Science, in which University of Florida faculty, staff and students submit artwork on the topic of science.

History 

The Marston Science Library was named for the seventh president of the University of Florida, Robert Q. Marston, who served from 1974 to 1984.  Marston was a medical doctor, research scientist and Rhodes Scholar, who previously served as the dean of the University of Mississippi School of Medicine (1961–1965) and the director of the National Institutes of Health (1968–1973).

Completed in 1987, the Marston Science Library brought together several existing science branch libraries, including the Agriculture Library (founded in 1905), the Physics Library (1909), the Botany Library (1909), the Engineering Library (1912), the Chemistry Library (1923) and the Biology-Geology Library (1947).

Collaboration Commons 

Collaboration Commons is the name for the renovated first floor of the Marston Science Library. Completed in the Fall of 2014, the approximately $5.7 million project was designed to act as a progressive study area for students. The new study space includes the additions of more general seating, a conference room, and multiple group study rooms. Innovative technology was also added, with 3D scanning and 3D printing equipment, as well as a multi-touch visualization wall and the new MADE@UF Lab for creating mobile apps and games all included as a part of the project.

The first floor of the Marston Science Library was previously home to around 190,000 pre-1990 academic journals and the sizeable Government Documents Department and Map & Imagery Library collection. In order to make room for the new project, the government documents and the journals were moved to be stored at the Auxiliary Library Facility, and the Map & Imagery Library collection was moved across campus to the first floor of Smathers Library East.

See also 
 History of the University of Florida
 List of University of Florida buildings
 List of University of Florida presidents
 University of Florida Campus Historic District

References

External links 
 Marston Science Library
 Government Documents Department
 Maps & Imagery Library
Marston Science Library within the University of Florida Libraries' History
Informational Leaflet on the Marston Library (2002 edition) from the University of Florida Digital Collections

Library buildings completed in 1987
Buildings at the University of Florida
Libraries in Florida
Florida Marston
Science libraries in the United States
1987 establishments in Florida